Robin Gayle Wright (born April 8, 1966) is an American actress. She has received various accolades, including a Golden Globe Award, and nominations for eight Primetime Emmy Awards.

Wright first gained attention for her role as Kelly Capwell in the NBC Daytime soap opera Santa Barbara  from 1984 to 1988. She transitioned to film with a starring role in the fantasy film The Princess Bride (1987), and she gained a nomination for a Golden Globe Award for Best Supporting Actress for her role in the top-grossing drama Forrest Gump (1994). She had further starring roles in the romantic drama Message in a Bottle (1999) and the thriller Unbreakable (2000), as she gained praise for her performances in the independent films Loved (1997), She's So Lovely (1997), Nine Lives (2005) and Sorry, Haters (2006). She has since taken on supporting roles in the sports drama Moneyball (2011), the thriller The Girl with the Dragon Tattoo (2011), the adventure film Everest (2015), the superhero film Wonder Woman (2017), and the science fiction film Blade Runner 2049 (2017).

On television, Wright starred in the HBO miniseries Empire Falls in 2005. From 2013 to 2018, she starred as Claire Underwood in the Netflix political drama series House of Cards. Her performance earned her a Golden Globe Award for Best Actress and six nominations for a Primetime Emmy Award for Outstanding Lead Actress. In 2016, Wright was named one of the highest paid actresses in the United States, earning US$420,000 per episode for House of Cards. She has also directed ten episodes of the series as well as two episodes of the Netflix crime series Ozark in 2022.

Early life
Wright was born April 8, 1966, in Dallas to Gayle Wright (née Gaston), a cosmetics saleswoman for Mary Kay, and Fred Wright, a pharmaceutical company employee. She has an elder brother, Richard (b. 1962), who is a photographer. Her parents divorced when she was two, which led to her relocating to San Diego, California with her mother. She grew up in Southern California, attending La Jolla High School in La Jolla and Taft High School in Los Angeles.

Film career
Wright began her career as a model, when she was 14. At the age of 18, she played Kelly Capwell in the NBC Daytime soap opera Santa Barbara, for which she received several Daytime Emmy Award nominations.

1980s–2000s: Transition into feature films

Wright transitioned into feature film work with a role in Hollywood Vice Squad in 1986, followed by her breakthrough role as Princess Buttercup in the cult film The Princess Bride in 1987. She gained critical acclaim in her role as Jenny Curran in Forrest Gump (1994), receiving Golden Globe Award and Screen Actors Guild nominations for Best Supporting Actress.

In 1996, she starred in the lead role of the film adaptation of Daniel Defoe's Moll Flanders (1996), for which she received a Satellite Award nomination for Best Actress in a Drama. She was nominated for a Screen Actors Guild Award for Best Actress for her role in She's So Lovely (1997), a film in which she co-starred with her then-husband Sean Penn. Wright received her third Screen Actors Guild Award nomination for her role in the television film Empire Falls (2005).

2013–2018: House of Cards
From 2013 to 2018, Wright appeared in the Netflix political drama streaming television series House of Cards in the role of Claire Underwood, the ruthless wife of political mastermind Frank Underwood. On January 12, 2014, she won a Golden Globe for the role, becoming the first actress to win the award for a streaming television series; she was nominated for the same award the following year. She also received nominations for the Primetime Emmy Award in 2013 and 2014 for the same role. Following Season 4 in 2016, Wright stated that she felt Claire Underwood was the equal of Frank Underwood and demanded equal pay for her performance as her co-star Kevin Spacey; Netflix acquiesced. In 2017, for her performance in the fifth season, Wright was nominated for her fifth consecutive Primetime Emmy for Outstanding Lead Actress in a Drama Series. For the years 2014, 2016, and 2017, Wright received Best Actress in a Drama Series nominations for the Critics' Choice Television Awards, with her being the only nomination for the show in December 2017.

In October 2017, she was set as the show's new lead for the final season, following the firing of Kevin Spacey due to sexual misconduct allegations against Spacey. For her last appearance as Underwood, her performance was acclaimed - described as a "commanding performance [that] is more than enough to keep [the final season] standing strong"  - earning her her final nominations for the role at the Screen Actors Guild and Primetime Emmy Awards in 2019. For the latter, she became one of seven women to be nominated for the category six or more times for the same show (the first in 10 years since Mariska Hargitay for Law & Order: Special Victims Unit).

Further film and directorial work

In 2017, Wright directed a short film, The Dark of Night, which starred Sam Rockwell and premiered at the Cannes Film Festival. Additionally, Wright played General Antiope in Wonder Woman (2017) and its 2020 sequel alongside Gal Gadot and Chris Pine. The film earned positive reviews and emerged as a financial success, grossing $822.8 million at the box office. She appears in the Blade Runner sequel Blade Runner 2049 alongside Ryan Gosling, Harrison Ford, and Jared Leto, directed by Denis Villeneuve.

In April 2019, it was announced that she would make her feature film directorial debut in the film Land. Wright would also be starring as its lead, Edee Mathis, a lawyer who retreats in grief to the Shoshone National Forest in Wyoming. Sales for the film would start at Cannes the following month. Filming began by October that year and the movie was picked up by distributor Focus Features. Land premiered in January 2021 at the Sundance Film Festival to generally positive reviews, with specific praise towards the direction and the performances. Peter Debruge in a review for Variety wrote: "So bless Wright for paring “Land” down to a beautiful haiku, and for delivering a performance that’s ambiguous and understated in all the right ways," and "in a directorial debut so pure and simple it speaks to enormous self-confidence, has better instincts than to reveal outright."

In 2022, Wright directed the final two episodes of the first part of season 4 of the Netflix show, Ozark; the episodes being entitled: "Sangre Sobre Todo" and "Sanctified". Kayla Cobb for Decider praised Wright's direction in the latter episode as "powerful" with the pairing of her direction, the script and actress Julia Garner's performance as a "masterful collaboration."

Wright will next star in and produce Ben Young's thriller Where All Light Tends to Go, an adaptation of the book of the same name by David Joy. In April 2022, Wright joined the cast of Netflix's fantasy film Damsel directed by Juan Carlos Fresnadillo. Wright will additionally star in a Sony Pictures Classics and Miramax adaptation of Richard McGuire's Here in a Forrest Gump reteam with director Robert Zemeckis, actor Tom Hanks and writer Eric Roth for a 2023 release.

Personal life

From 1986 to 1988, Wright was married to actor Dane Witherspoon, whom she met in 1984 on the set of the soap opera Santa Barbara.

In 1989, Wright became involved with actor Sean Penn following his divorce from Madonna. Wright was offered the role of Maid Marian in the film Robin Hood: Prince of Thieves, but turned it down because she was pregnant. Their daughter, Dylan Frances, was born in April 1991. She backed out of the role of Abby McDeere in The Firm (1993) due to her pregnancy with her second child, and their son, Hopper Jack, was born in August 1993.

After breaking up and getting back together, Wright and Penn married in 1996. Their on-and-off relationship seemingly ended in divorce plans, announced in December 2007, but the divorce petition was withdrawn four months later at the couple's request. In February 2009, Wright and Penn attended the 81st Academy Awards together, at which Penn won the Best Actor award. Penn filed for legal separation in April 2009, but withdrew the petition in May. On August 12, 2009, Wright filed for divorce, declaring she had no plans to reconcile. The divorce was finalized on July 22, 2010.

In February 2012, Wright began dating actor Ben Foster, and their engagement was announced in January 2014. The couple called off their engagement in November 2014, but reunited in January 2015. On August 29, 2015, they announced they were ending their second engagement. In 2017, Wright began dating Clément Giraudet, a Saint Laurent executive, and they secretly wed in August 2018 in La Roche-sur-le-Buis, France. Wright filed for divorce from Giraudet in September 2022.

Philanthropy and activism
Wright is the honorary spokesperson for the Dallas, Texas-based non-profit The Gordie Foundation.

In 2014, she co-partnered with two California-based companies; Pour Les Femmes and The SunnyLion. The SunnyLion donates a portion of its profits to the Raise Hope For Congo movement.

Wright is an activist for human rights in the Democratic Republic of the Congo. She is the narrator and executive producer of the documentary When Elephants Fight which highlights how multinational mining corporations and politicians in the Democratic Republic of Congo threaten human rights, and perpetuate conflict in the region. She also is a supporter of Stand With Congo, the human rights campaign behind the film. In 2016, Wright spoke publicly in support of the campaign at a film screening at the TriBeCa Film Institute in New York City, in media interviews, with journalists, and across her social media accounts.

Filmography

Film

Television

Awards and nominations

References

External links

 
 
 

1966 births
Living people
20th-century American actresses
21st-century American actresses
Actresses from Dallas
Actresses from San Diego
American film actresses
American soap opera actresses
American television actresses
American television directors
Best Drama Actress Golden Globe (television) winners
American women television directors
William Howard Taft Charter High School alumni